This is a list of episodes of animation based on the School Rumble manga. Note that all of the English translations are official titles with the exception of the second OVA pair

Series overview

Episode list

School Rumble

School Rumble: 2nd Semester

Specials

School Rumble: Extra Class

School Rumble: 3rd Semester

References

School Rumble
Episodes

ja:スクールランブル (アニメ)